La voce del padrone is an album by Italian singer-songwriter Franco Battiato, released by EMI Italiana in 1981. The album followed L'era del cinghiale bianco (1979) and Patriots (1980), which signaled a return by Battiato to a more pop-oriented style.

Besides being Battiato's first pop success, it was also the first Italian LP to sell more than one million copies.

Overview 
Before L'era del cinghiale bianco Battiato had begun to collaborate with violinist and composer Giusto Pio. In La voce del padrone Battiato could rely on Pio's collaboration too, even if violin was never used in the scores.

Album 
The album is a mixture of synthpop, dance and progressive. "Bandiera Bianca" quotes "Mr. Tambourine Man" by Bob Dylan, while "Cuccurucucù" borrows the refrain from the Tomás Méndez song "Cucurrucucú paloma". The better known songs of this album are "Summer On a Solitary Beach", "Bandiera Bianca" (one of the best known songs by Battiato) and "Centro Di Gravità Permanente". The title of the album references the Italian offshoot of the HMV record label – La voce del padrone.

"Summer On A Solitary Beach" was released as a single.

Track listing 
 "Summer on a solitary beach" - 4:34
 "Bandiera bianca" - 5:19
 "Gli uccelli" - 4:43
 "Cuccurucucù" - 4:09
 "Segnali di vita" - 3:37
 "Centro di gravità permanente" - 3:55
 "Sentimiento nuevo" - 4:18

Personnel 
Alfredo Golino - Drums
Paolo Donnarumma - Bass guitar
Filippo Destrieri - Keyboards
Alberto Radius - Guitar
Claudio Pascoli - Saxophone
Donato Scolese - Vibraphone
Madrigalisti di Milano - Choir

1981 albums
Franco Battiato albums
Italian-language albums